Native trees in Ottawa are trees that are naturally growing in Ottawa, Ontario and were not later introduced by humans. Many of Ottawa's native trees have been displaced by non-native plants and trees introduced by settlers from Europe and Asia from the 18th century to the present. Most of the native trees are found in the Greenbelt, parks, and along the Rideau and Ottawa rivers.

The type of trees growing across the city varies based on the soil condition in the area. Tree cover in the city prior to European settlement started from the shore line back. Settlement resulted in trees being cut for use in building homes and ships and for heating by early residents. The city's Urban Forestry Services plants these trees on city property and encourages others in the city to do the same.

A partial list of native trees in Ottawa:

Ash
Black ash
Green ash
White ash
Aspen
Balsam poplar
Large-tooth aspen
Trembling aspen
Basswood
American basswood
Birch
White birch
Yellow birch
Beech
American beech
Cedar
Eastern Redcedar
Eastern White Cedar
Chestnut
American chestnut
Dogwoods
Alternate-leaved dogwood
Elm
American elm
Hackberry
Northern hackberry
Hawthorns
Hickory
Bitternut hickory
Shagbark hickory
Hemlock
Eastern hemlock
Hop-hornbeam
Ironwood
Hornbeam
Blue-beech
Larch
Tamarack
Maple
Red maple
Silver maple
Striped maple
Sugar maple
Mountain-ash
American mountain-ash
Oak
Bur oak
Eastern black oak
Northern red oak
Pin oak
Swamp white oak
White oak
Pine
Eastern white pine
Jack Pine
Pitch Pine
Red Pine
Prunus
Black cherry
Chokecherry
Pin cherry
Serviceberries
Spruce
Black Spruce
White Spruce
Walnut
Butternut
Black walnut
Willow
Black willow
Peachleaf willow

See also
 Ottawa Greenbelt

References

External links
Tree Canopy Assessment - Canada’s Capital Region - Fall 2019

Trees of Ontario
Geography of Ottawa